The 2001 Tulsa Golden Hurricane football team represented the University of Tulsa as a member of the Western Athletic Conference (WAC) during the 2001 NCAA Division I-A football season. Led by second-year head coach Keith Burns, the Golden Hurricane compiled an overall record of 1–10 with a mark of 0–8 in conference play, placing last out of ten teams in the WAC. Tulsa played home games at Skelly Stadium in Tulsa, Oklahoma.

Schedule

References

Tulsa
Tulsa Golden Hurricane football seasons
Tulsa Golden Hurricane football